Events from the year 1170 in Ireland.

Events
21 September - Following a siege, combined Anglo-Norman and Irish forces seize Dublin, forcing Ascall mac Ragnaill, King of Dublin, into exile.
Arrival of Richard de Clare, 2nd Earl of Pembroke (Strongbow).
Strongbow is married to Dermot MacMurrough’s daughter, Aoife.
Invasion of Meath.

References